Colus aurariae is a species of sea snail, a marine gastropod mollusk in the family Colidae, the true whelks and the like.

Description

Distribution

References

External links
 Fraussen K., Rosado J., Afonso C.M.L. & Monteiro B. (2009). A new and elegant Colus Röding, 1798 (Gastropoda: Buccinidae) from off Portugal. Novapex 10(4): 119-124

Colidae
Gastropods described in 2009